The first World Combat Games were held in Beijing, China, from August 28 to September 4, 2010. 136 gold medals were vied for by 1,108 competitors from all five continents.

There were twelve martial arts sports competitions: boxing, judo, ju-jitsu, karate, kendo, kickboxing, muaythai, sambo, sumo, taekwondo, wrestling and wushu.

Schedule

Participating nations

Ambassadors
Aikido:  Lydia la Rivière-Zijdel
Judo:  Robert Van de Walle
Ju-Jitsu:  Bertrand Amoussou-Guenou
Karate:  Tsuguo Sakumoto
Kendo:  Yoshimitsu Takeyasu
Kickboxing:  Don Wilson
Muaythai:  Gavintra Photijak
Sambo:  Fedor Emelianenko
Sumo:  Kyokushūzan Noboru
Taekwondo:  Jung Joon-ho
Wrestling:  Rulon Gardner
Wushu:  Jet Li

Medalists

Boxing

Men

Judo

Men

Women

Ju-jitsu

Men

Women

Mixed

Karate

Men

Women

Kendo

Men

Women

Kickboxing

Men

Women

Muaythai

Men

Women

Sambo

Men – Combat

Men

Women

Sumo

Men

Women

Taekwondo

Men

Women

Wrestling

Men

Women

Wushu

Men

Women

Medal table

External links
 Official site
 Results

2010
2010 in multi-sport events
2010 in Chinese sport
Sports competitions in Beijing
2010s in Beijing
International sports competitions hosted by China
Multi-sport events in China